Meractaea is a genus of crabs in the family Xanthidae, containing the following species:

 Meractaea brucei Serene, 1984
 Meractaea multidentata Davie, 1997
 Meractaea tafai Davie, 1992

References

Xanthoidea